The Ingoldsby Baronetcy, of Lethenborough in the County of Buckingham, was a title in the Baronetage of England. It was created on 30 August 1661 for Henry Ingoldsby. The title became extinct on the death of the third Baronet in 1726.

Ingoldsby Baronets, of Lethenborough (1661)
Sir Henry Ingoldsby, 1st Baronet (1622–1701)
Sir George Ingoldsby, 2nd Baronet. Married Anne, daughter of Sir Peter Stanley of Alderley Hall, 2nd Bt. (1626–1683).  One son, William.
Sir William Ingoldsby, 3rd Baronet (1670–1726). Married Theophila, daughter of Sir Kingsmill Lucy of Broxbourne 2nd Bt. One daughter.

References

Extinct baronetcies in the Baronetage of England
1661 establishments in England